James M. McCaw is an Australian mathematical biologist. He is professor of Mathematical Biology in the School of Mathematics and Statistics and in the Melbourne School of Population and Global Health at the University of Melbourne, where he is also Associate Dean (of Research).

He is primarily known for his work in response to the COVID-19 pandemic in which he assisted in informing Australia's public health response. Prior to the COVID-19 pandemic he had carried out award winning research on infectious diseases, notably influenza and malaria. He is on the editorial board for several scholarly journals including Epidemics and Infectious Disease Modelling.

Education

McCaw obtained his B.Sc. and PhD in theoretical physics from the University of Melbourne where he served as President of the Postgraduate Physics Students Society.

References

External links 

 

Year of birth missing (living people)
Living people
Australian mathematicians
University of Melbourne alumni
Academic staff of the University of Melbourne